Medayil Radhakrishnan Rajakrishnan (born 25 May 1977) is an Indian audiographer. He won the National Film Award for Best Audiography in 2019 for the film Rangasthalam (2018). He won Kerala State Film Award for Audio mixing  in 2011 for the films Urumi, Chaappa Kurish and 2012 for the film Manchadikuru and Pearl award by Kerala film Producers Association for the film Manchadikuru in 2013. He has worked in Tamil, Hindi, Telugu, Marathi and Malayalam feature films.

Early life 
Rajakrishnan was born on 25 May 1977. His father, M. G. Radhakrishnan, was one of the most renowned music directors of Malayalam film industry and a maestro of Carnatic Music. His mother, Padmaja Radhakrishnan, has set her stage in the field of Art and Literature. His grandparents, Malabar Gopalan Nair and Kamalakshi Amma were also musicians. His uncle M. G. Sreekumar is a famous singer in Malayalam.

He practiced Carnatic music under his aunt, a renowned Carnatic vocalist, Dr. K. Omanakutty and also studied mridangam under the guidance of Mavelikara Krishnankutty Nair and Thripunithura Radhakrishnan. He completed his bachelor's degree in economics. He later did his course in sound designing from Chethana Studio, Thrissur.

Career 
At the early age of 23, Rajakrishnan worked with Deepan Chatterji as an assistant sound engineer. He has assisted him in around 70 films, which includes Balothekko (Bengali), which secured National Award in the year 2004. He later joined Four Frames Sound Company, Chennai as an assistant sound engineer and now works as the chief sound engineer for the same. He has worked with most of the directors in Malayalam and has done sound designing and mixing for over 200 films in various languages which includes Malayalam, Hindi, Tamil, Kannada, Marathi, Telugu and Bengali.

Rajakrishnan has also composed music for the film Winter (directed by Dipu Karunakaran) with his uncle, M.G. Sreekumar, on the vocals. He has also done jingles for directors like Priyadarshan, Major Ravi and Dipu. His next feature film as music composer is Mr. Bean (Malayalam movie)

Rajakrishnan has been the choice of many Indian Film Directors like S. Priyadarshan, Santosh Sivan, Lal Jose, Major Ravi, V.K Prakash, A.L Vijay, Selvaraghavan and Anjali Menon to name a few.

Awards 
 2019 National Film Awards for Best Audiography for the film Rangasthalam
 2015: Kerala State Film Award for Best Sound mixing for the film Charlie (Malayalam)
 2013: Kerala State Film Award for Best Sound mixing for the film Chaappa Kurish and Urumi
 2013: Pearl Award for Best Sound design for the film Manchadikuru (Malayalam)
 2012: Kerala State Film Award for Best Sound mixing for the film Manchadikuru (Malayalam)
 2012: Surya TV Award For Best Sound Designer for his work in Urumi
 2011: Reporter Channel Award for Best Sound Mixing for his work in Urumi
 2011: Kerala State Film Awards for his work in Urumi
 2006: Kerala Film Critics Award for Best Sound Mixing for his work in Keerthichakra
 2006: Amritha Fertanity Award for Best Audiography for his work in Ananthabadhram

Filmography 

References

1977 births
Living people
Kerala State Film Award winners
Indian sound designers
Musicians from Thiruvananthapuram
Malayalam film score composers
21st-century Indian composers
Tamil film score composers